Walter Brown (pejoratively nicknamed "Walter the Softy") is a fictional character that appears in the British comic magazine The Beano. He is the rival and antagonist to Dennis the Menace who is vilified because of his lack of interest in stereotypically masculine activities and attitudes. From his first appearance in 1953, Walter became the target of Dennis' pranks and misbehaviour but would brush it off. Sometime in the 1980s, Walter's characterisation changed after reader backlash and made him a snobbish rich boy foil to his enemies.

Character background 
Walter Brown first appeared in issue 577 of The Beano in Dennis the Menace, two years after the comic strip's debut. He is a seemingly "perfect" child who is adored by his teachers for his hardworking and polite attitude. He enjoys picking flowers, ballet dancing in a tutu, playing with tea sets and Wendy houses, knitting and cross-dressing, with friends that act similar, owning well-behaved pets throughout the years (Fluffy the cat, Foo-Foo the dog, and Clawdius the cat).

Walter has neat black hair and wears round-lensed glasses, a red bow tie in his shirt collar, a blue jumper and black shorts. His surname was not revealed until 1994.

Characterisation 
Walter's personality and behaviour fluctuated, depending on the writer: he remained a diligent student and uninterested in playing sports, but would be a spoilt mummy's boy in one story, then a whiny coward who was scared of rain in another. Some stories featured Walter being courageous enough to create pranks and traps to irritate or frame Dennis, and other stories showed Dennis and/or Gnasher intimidating him for their entertainment, with Walter too scared and startled to fight back.

When the 1996 Dennis the Menace cartoon adaptation aired on CBBC, Walter became a snob and his friends joined in on the stuck-up attitude towards Dennis' group. The behaviour remained in the comic strips.

Personal life 
The Beano had a notable generation jump with the Dennis the Menace and Minnie the Minx series after Dennis' parents changed into new designs, and his father was revealed as the original Dennis three years later. Despite this, Walter still lives with his mother and father, and his pets. In his original characterisation, a girl named Priscilla made a one-issue appearance and Dennis refers to her as Walter's sister, but she has not appeared since. The 1996 cartoon revealed he had an uncle who was a barber named Slasher obsessed with Dennis' hair. Walter's parents were always characterised as a wealthy couple who spoil their son, but Walter's post-2012 reincarnation shows his father, Wilbur, as the prideful, smug mayor of Beanotown, who was once Dennis' father's bullying target when they were children.

Walter is friends with other schoolboys who are as hardworking and unmanly like him, with similar hobbies. Originally, he had two: Algernon Scott "Scotty" (formerly "Spotty") Perkins and Bertram James "Bertie" Blenkinsop, but the magazine and children's cartoons have also introduced "Sweet" William, Jeremy Snodgrass, "Softy" Matthew and "Nervous" Rex. His girlfriend Matilda was a short-tempered redhead with a lisp who notably appeared in the 1996 cartoon; Walter was devoted to her to the point of implications that she bossed him around.

Relationship with Dennis 
From Walter's debut, he and Dennis the Menace have been enemies. Walter's nerdiness, as well as his hobbies, led to his nickname "Walter the Softy" (and his friends collectively dubbed "The Softies"), and often offends Dennis and Gnasher by his presence alone. Despite the tension and violence, Dennis has turned to Walter in desperation, such as when Gnasher disappeared for six issues in 1986, finding Gnipper's long-lost sisters when the puppy had been poisoned, helping Rasher win a pig race, and trying to save Dennis's favourite tree. They once find out the two are distant cousins, but it has only been mentioned once.

Controversy
For an unspecified time, some former readers have assumed Walter was an unconfirmed-but-implied gay character for The Beano. The magazine's readership historically being young boys looking for masculine role models through characters that were superheroes, military personnel and brave adventurers automatically made male characters like Walter an ideal antagonist for the rebellious, school-hating, football-loving Dennis, but Dennis' violence towards Walter when Walter was not paying attention to him led to concerns that it would encourage children into homophobic bullying. Dennis' aggression towards Walter softened, and Walter's antagonism increased, his post-2012 version wanting to rid Beanotown of all its fun, as well as his heterosexual relationship with Matilda. Beano spokesman Mike Stirling later said in 2013 that Walter's post-2012 version would hopefully be "dramatically satisfying" reason for readers if Dennis turned violent because "[Walter Brown] doesn't want to be a kid, he wants to be a grownup and is always snitching on kids who are having fun."

Parodies
 Walter is parodied in some editions of the adult comic Viz as "Cedric Soft" in the strip about popular character Biffa Bacon. Their relationship is in a similar vein to Walter's with Dennis, with extreme comic violence added.
 In the Judge Dredd story Judgement Day, the villain's origin was a pastiche of the Beano: Soppi Walter, routinely terrorised and attacked by the bully Big Den (surname shown as "Mennis"). Soppi turned out to be a sociopath and learned necromancy in order to kill, resurrect, and torture his bully.
 In April 2018, Beano Studios issued a cease and desist letter to Jacob Rees-Mogg, a prominent British right-wing Conservative MP with upper middle-class mannerisms, asserting that Rees-Mogg was imitating Walter.

References

External links 

DC Thomson Comics characters
Child characters in comics
Male characters in comics
Comics characters introduced in 1953
British comics characters
Dennis the Menace and Gnasher
Effeminacy
Fictional cross-dressers